Sayyid Asa'ad bin Tariq Al Said is an Omani politician and retired military officer. He is the brother of Sultan Haitham bin Tariq Al Said, and the cousin of former Sultan Qaboos bin Said. He was Deputy Prime Minister for relations and international cooperation affairs Sultanate of Oman from 2017.

Biography 
Brigadier-General Sayyid Asa'ad bin Tariq Al Said was educated at Al-Saidia School, Muscat, Millfield School, Street, Somerset, Royal Military Academy Sandhurst, Camberley, Surrey, and King's College, London (BA Military School, 1986).

Honours 
National honours
 Order of Al-Russoukh 1st class (23 November 2010).
 Military Order of Oman, 2nd class.
 10th Anniversary Medal.
 15th Anniversary Medal.
 25th Anniversary Medal.
 35th Anniversary Medal.
Foreign honours
 Order of King Abdulaziz, 1st class (24 December 2006).

Ancestry

References 

Al Said dynasty
1954 births
Living people
Omani politicians
Omani royalty
Graduates of the Royal Military Academy Sandhurst
People from Muscat, Oman
Alumni of King's College London
People educated at Millfield